M. quadrilineatus may refer to:

 Macrosteles quadrilineatus, a leafhopper species in the family Cicadellidae
 Macrotylus quadrilineatus, a European plant bug species in the family Miridae